In July 1886, the Atlanta and Florida Railway was chartered as the Atlanta and Hawkinsville Railroad to connect Atlanta, Georgia, and Hawkinsville, Georgia.  The Atlanta and Florida Railroad name was instituted in 1887, and in November 1888, the railroad reached Fort Valley, 105 miles from Atlanta; however, it never reached Hawkinsville.  

The company was reorganized as the Atlanta and Florida Railway in 1893, and the property was sold to the Southern Railway in 1895.

References

External links
Storey, Steve.  "Atlanta & Florida Railroad," Georgia's Railroad History and Heritage.

Predecessors of the Southern Railway (U.S.)
Defunct Georgia (U.S. state) railroads
Railway companies established in 1893
Railway companies disestablished in 1895
1893 establishments in Georgia (U.S. state)
American companies established in 1893
1895 mergers and acquisitions